Hoog Kana is a hamlet in the Dutch province of Gelderland. It is a part of the municipality of Buren, and lies about 7.94 km south of Veenendaal.

It was first mentioned in 1994 as Hoog Kana. Hoog means high, and Kana is probably a reference to Kafr Kanna where Jesus performed his first miracle. It is not a statistical entity, and the postal authorities have placed it under Ingen. The street name is Hoogkana as one word. The hamlet consists of about 70 houses.

References

Populated places in Gelderland
Buren